Pavel Vyacheslavovich Koledov (Коледов Павел Вячеславович ; born September 20, 1994) is a Russian professional ice hockey defenceman. He is currently playing with Salavat Yulaev Ufa of the Kontinental Hockey League (KHL).

Koledov made his Kontinental Hockey League (KHL) debut playing with Lokomotiv Yaroslavl during the 2012–13 KHL season.

References

External links

1994 births
Living people
HC Sibir Novosibirsk players
HC Sochi players
Lokomotiv Yaroslavl players
Russian ice hockey defencemen
Salavat Yulaev Ufa players
Sibirskie Snaipery players
Sportspeople from Novosibirsk